HD 68601 is a class A7Ib (white supergiant) star in the constellation Puppis. Its apparent magnitude is 4.75 and it is approximately 4,200 light years away based on parallax.

It has one companion, B, with magnitude 9.81 and separation 26.4".

References

Puppis
A-type supergiants
CD-42 3979
068601
Binary stars
040096
3226